Perry County is a county located in the U.S. state of Ohio. As of the 2020 census, the population was 35,408. Its county seat is New Lexington. It was established on March 1, 1818, from parts of Fairfield, Washington and Muskingum counties. The county is named for Oliver Hazard Perry, a hero of the War of 1812. Perry County is included in the Columbus, OH Metropolitan Statistical Area. One of the poorest counties in the state, this is where the lawsuit challenging Ohio's school funding system, DeRolph v. State, began.

Geography

Adjacent counties
 Licking County (north)
 Muskingum County (northeast)
 Morgan County (southeast)
 Athens County (south)
 Hocking County (southwest)
 Fairfield County (west)

National protected area
 Wayne National Forest (part)

Demographics

2000 census
As of the census of 2000, there were 34,078 people, 12,500 households, and 9,350 families living in the county. The population density was 83 people per square mile (32/km2). There were 13,655 housing units at an average density of 33 per square mile (13/km2). The racial makeup of the county was 98.54% White, 0.22% Black or African American, 0.28% Native American, 0.10% Asian, 0.01% Pacific Islander, 0.09% from other races, and 0.76% from two or more races. 0.45% of the population were Hispanic or Latino of any race.

There were 12,500 households, out of which 36.7% had children under the age of 18 living with them, 60.1% were married couples living together, 9.8% had a female householder with no husband present, and 25.2% were non-families. 21.4% of all households were made up of individuals, and 9.9% had someone living alone who was 65 years of age or older. The average household size was 2.70 and the average family size was 3.13.

In the county, the population was spread out, with 28.1% under the age of 18, 8.5% from 18 to 24, 29.1% from 25 to 44, 22.3% from 45 to 64, and 12.0% who were 65 years of age or older. The median age was 35 years. For every 100 females there were 98.9 males. For every 100 females age 18 and over, there were 95.4 males.

The median income for a household in the county was $34,383, and the median income for a family was $40,294. Males had a median income of $31,664 versus $21,147 for females. The per capita income for the county was $15,674. About 9.4% of families and 11.8% of the population were below the poverty line, including 15.2% of those under age 18 and 12.70% of those age 65 or over.

2010 census
As of the 2010 United States Census, there were 36,058 people, 13,576 households, and 9,738 families living in the county. The racial makeup of the county was 97.9% white, 0.3% black or African American, 0.2% American Indian, 0.1% Asian, 0.1% from other races, and 1.4% from two or more races. Those of Hispanic or Latino origin made up 0.5% of the population. In terms of ancestry, 25.4% were German, 14.9% were Irish, 10.4% were English, and 9.6% were American.

Of the 13,576 households, 35.7% had children under the age of 18 living with them, 54.3% were married couples living together, 11.6% had a female householder with no husband present, 28.3% were non-families, and 22.8% of all households were made up of individuals. The average household size was 2.63 and the average family size was 3.06. The median age was 38.6 years.

The median income for a household in the county was $42,388 and the median income for a family was $50,489. Males had a median income of $39,305 versus $31,112 for females. The per capita income for the county was $18,916. About 14.2% of families and 18.5% of the population were below the poverty line, including 26.4% of those under age 18 and 8.6% of those age 65 or over.

Politics
Perry County tended to be a swing county prior to 2016. Bill Clinton was the last Democrat to win this county, a distinction shared with 16 other Ohio counties, in 1996. In 2020, Trump won the largest percentage of votes in the county of any Republican nominee since the party's founding.

|}

Communities

Villages

 Corning
 Crooksville
 Glenford
 Hemlock
 Junction City
 New Lexington (county seat)
 New Straitsville
 Rendville
 Roseville (partial)
 Shawnee
 Somerset (former county seat)
 Thornville

Townships

 Bearfield
 Clayton
 Coal
 Harrison
 Hopewell
 Jackson
 Madison
 Monday Creek
 Monroe
 Pike
 Pleasant
 Reading
 Salt Lick
 Thorn

https://web.archive.org/web/20160715023447/http://www.ohiotownships.org/township-websites

Census-designated places
 Rose Farm
 Thornport

Unincorporated communities

 Bristol
 Buckingham
 Chalfants
 Chapel Hill
 Clarksville
 Crossenville
 McCuneville
 McLuney
 Millertown
 Milligan
 Mount Perry
 Moxahala
 New Reading
 Oakfield
 Portersville, Ohio
 Rehoboth
 Saltillo
 Sego
 Sulphur Springs

Ghost towns
 Dicksonton
 San Toy

See also
 National Register of Historic Places listings in Perry County, Ohio

Media
 Perry County has its own newspaper called the Perry County Tribune.

External links
 Perry County Official Website
 Perry County Chamber of Commerce

Footnotes

Further reading
 Thomas William Lewis, History of Southeastern Ohio and the Muskingum Valley, 1788-1928. In Three Volumes. Chicago: S.J. Clarke Publishing Co., 1928.

 
Appalachian Ohio
Counties of Appalachia
1818 establishments in Ohio
Populated places established in 1818